Liverpool Reform Synagogue is a Reform Jewish synagogue in the Wavertree district of Liverpool, England.

Overview

Affiliated with the Movement for Reform Judaism, the synagogue was opened in the Wavertree district by the Liberal Jewish Congregation of Liverpool (LJCL) in 1962 under the name Progressive Synagogue. The LJCL had moved to Wavertree from its previous location on Hope Place off Hope Street in the city centre, where it had been founded in 1928, making it one of the UK's first Reform Jewish communities to be established outside of London. The Hope Place building now houses the Unity Theatre.

At an unknown date, Progressive Synagogue closed down and was converted into a Grade II listed building and a block of apartments, prompting the congregation to open the current synagogue in a neighbouring building on the same site. Services today are usually led by Martin Herr, though the synagogue also has a part-time rabbi in Warren Elf , who is based in Manchester and is also the part-time rabbi at Southend and District Reform Synagogue in Southend-on-Sea.

Notable members
 Luciana Berger (born 1981), politician and former MP for the local constituency.

See also
 List of Jewish communities in the United Kingdom
 Movement for Reform Judaism

References

External links
Official website
The Movement for Reform Judaism
Liverpool Reform Synagogue on Jewish Communities and Records UK
Liverpool Reform Synagogue on the Jewish Small Communities Network

Buildings and structures in Liverpool
Organisations based in Liverpool
Reform synagogues in the United Kingdom
Religion in Merseyside
Jewish organizations established in 1928